The 2015 Team Long Track World Championship was the ninth annual FIM Team Long Track World Championship. The final took place on 28 June 2015 in Mühldorf, Germany. Great Britain won the event for the first time.

Results
  Mühldorf
 28 June 2015

Scorers
Source:

 Jorg Tebbe beat Jesse Mustonen in a Run-off for the Silver Medal

See also
 2015 World Longtrack Championship
 2015 Speedway World Cup

References

Team Long Track World Championship